Snooker world rankings 2002/2003: The professional world rankings for the top 64 snooker players in the 2002–03 season are listed below.

References

2002
Rankings 2003
Rankings 2002